The 2015 season was the St. Louis Rams' 78th in the National Football League, their fourth under head coach Jeff Fisher, and their 21st and final season in St. Louis, Missouri, their home since the 1995 season.

The Rams improved on their 6–10 record from 2014 by going 7–9 for the 2015 season, but tied a record set between 1956 and 1966 by missing the playoffs for the eleventh consecutive season.

After the season, an arbitral tribunal gave permission for the Rams to void their lease on the Edward Jones Dome. Rams owner Stan Kroenke filed a formal application with the league to relocate the Rams to their long-time home of Los Angeles, California, where the team played at the Los Angeles Memorial Coliseum for four seasons at until their stadium in Inglewood, California was complete. They were originally slated to play at the Coliseum for only three seasons; delays in the construction of the new venue resulted in the added season for which they would play at the historic Coliseum. Kroenke's request to move the team to Los Angeles was approved on January 12, 2016, at a meeting in Houston, Texas.

The Rams' starting quarterbacks during the season, Nick Foles and Case Keenum, started against each other at quarterback in the 2017 NFC Championship Game, the only time to date this has occurred.

2015 draft class

Draft trades
 The Rams traded their original fourth- and sixth-round selections (Nos. 109 and 184 overall, respectively) to the Tampa Bay Buccaneers in exchange for safety Mark Barron.
 The Rams traded quarterback Sam Bradford and their fifth-round selection (No. 145 overall) to the Philadelphia Eagles in exchange for quarterback Nick Foles, the Eagles' fourth-round selection (No. 119 overall) and the Eagles' second round selection in 2016. The Eagles will receive a 2016 fourth-round selection if Bradford plays fewer than 50 percent of the snaps; the selection will upgrade to a third-rounder if Bradford does not play at all in 2015. Bradford started for the Eagles Week 1, eliminating the possibility of the third-round upgrade.
 The Rams traded one of their two seventh-round selections (No. 249 overall – acquired in a trade that sent wide receiver Greg Salas to the New England Patriots), along with their 2013 second-round selection to the Atlanta Falcons in exchange for the Falcons' 2013 first-, third- and sixth-round selections.
 The Rams traded their second round selection (No. 41 overall) to the Carolina Panthers (used to select Devin Funchess, WR, Michigan) for Carolina's second round selection (No. 57 overall, used to select Rob Havenstein), third round selection (No. 89 overall, used to select Sean Mannion) and sixth round selection (No. 201 overall, used to select Bud Sasser).
 The Rams traded RB Zac Stacy to the New York Jets for their seventh round selection (No. 224 overall, used to select Bryce Hager).

Supplemental draft
The Rams selected Clemson offensive tackle Isaiah Battle in the 2015 Supplemental draft. As a result, the team will forfeit their fifth-round selection in the 2016 draft.

Staff

Final roster

Schedule

Preseason

Regular season

Note: Intra-division opponents are in bold text.

Game summaries

Week 1: vs. Seattle Seahawks

The Rams opened their 2015 season at home against Seattle. In Nick Foles' Rams debut, he threw for 297 yards and a touchdown.

The defense, for the most part, sacked Russell Wilson several times and limited Marshawn Lynch to just 73 rushing yards.

The game was hard fought and the Rams would win in overtime, 34-31.

Week 2: at Washington Redskins

The Rams traveled to Maryland to take on the Redskins. They struggled offensively and defensively all game. The defense, for the most part, struggled to contain Matt Jones on the ground as Jones had a big day with 123 yards rushing along with two touchdowns.

Week 3: vs. Pittsburgh Steelers

Prior to kickoff, the game was delayed due to the turf being caught on fire, coming from the fireworks.

The Rams struggled offensively and defensively all game long.  The defense, for the most part, sacked Ben Roethlisberger until he left the game with an apparent knee injury. Michael Vick took over for the rest of the game.

Late in the fourth quarter Kenny Britt's catch was overturned. The Steelers would go on to stun the Rams, 12-6.

Week 4: at Arizona Cardinals

The Rams traveled to Phoenix to meet the red-hot Cardinals, the 2nd highest-scoring team in the league. Todd Gurley earned his first start as Rams' running back and he finished the game with 146 rushing yards. After the game, Bruce Arians commented that Gurley, "played like a rookie". The Rams defense, for the most part, held the Cardinals to field goals, and sacked Carson Palmer four times. With the close win, the Rams improved to 2-2.

Week 5: at Green Bay Packers

Traveling to Lambeau, the Rams looked to end the Packers' hot streak at 4-1. However, they failed to do this, as Nick Foles was intercepted four times. On defense, James Laurinitis intercepted a pass from Aaron Rodgers, Rodger's first interception thrown in Lambeau in 20 games. However, the defense, for the most part, struggled to contain the Packers explosive receiving corps all day long. With the loss, the Rams dropped to 2-3.

Week 7: vs. Cleveland Browns

For the first time since Week 8 of 2007, the Rams hosted the Cleveland Browns in St. Louis. In the first quarter, Rodney McLeod returned a fumble to the end zone to give the Rams the game's first points. Todd Gurley was limited to just 45 yards in the first half, but he managed to turn things around in the second half, rushing for 83 yards and two touchdowns.

With the win, the Rams went to 3-3.

Week 8: vs. San Francisco 49ers

The Rams wore their 1973-1999 throwbacks against the San Francisco 49ers for the first time in the season. Todd Gurley had another productive day, and he rushed for 133 yards, including a 71-yard run for a touchdown. The Rams used two Tavon Austin touchdowns for the final score. Although Chris Long did not play, the Rams executed defensively, putting pressure on Colin Kaepernick all game long.

With the win, the Rams improved to 4-3, making it the first time since 2012 the Rams were above .500 excluding a Week 1 victory.

Week 9: at Minnesota Vikings

Nine years after Week 17 of 2006, the Rams traveled to Minnesota to take on the Vikings. In that game, the Rams easily defeated the Vikings, 41-21, which stunned the Vikings fans. The game was played at the Metrodome.

In the duel of running backs, between Todd Gurley and Adrian Peterson, Gurley was held to just 89 yards. Peterson was the game's leading rusher with 125 yards.

Without several defensive starters including Robert Quinn, the Rams defense struggled to contain the Vikings offense, especially their explosive receiving corps, all game long.

In the second quarter, Greg Zuerlein nailed a 61-yard field goal to give the Rams a 12-10 lead. The field goal put Zuerlein 7th in NFL history for longest field goal made, and as the only kicker in NFL history besides Sebastian Janikowski to have more than one field goal of 60 yards or longer in his career.

In the second half, Lamarcus Joyner hit Teddy Bridgewater in the head, forcing Teddy to leave the game with a concussion. Thom Brennaman called the hit on Bridgewater "dirty". Shaun Hill, who played for the Rams last year and returned to Minnesota for his second stint in the off-season, took over for Teddy for the game's remainder.

With the Rams trailing 18-15 in the fourth quarter, Zuerlein booted another field goal, forcing the game into overtime. However, in that period, Minnesota's Blair Walsh nailed the game-winning field goal to give the Vikings the final score.

With the narrow loss, the Rams dropped to 4-4.

Week 10: vs. Chicago Bears

Two years after Week 12 of 2013, the Rams hosted the Chicago Bears.

Prior to Week 10, Stedman Bailey was suspended for 4 games for violating the league's substance abuse policy. Later, the Rams acquired free agent Wes Welker, who last played for the Denver Broncos last season. He helped the Broncos to the Super Bowl in 2013.

The Rams struggled all game especially on defense in which they could not contain the Bears offense, especially the running game despite an injury to Matt Forte. Nick Foles struggled all day and this time it would force Case Keenum to take over late in the fourth quarter. Much like last week at Minnesota, Todd Gurley was once again held to 89 yards. Newly acquired Welker was no help, either.

With the embarrassing loss, the Rams dropped to 4-5.

Week 11: at Baltimore Ravens

Case Keenum started in place of the incumbent Nick Foles.

Late in the fourth quarter, with the game tied at 13, Greg Zurlien missed a 52-yarder which would have sealed the Rams victory. With a second left, Justin Tucker nailed a 41-yarder to give the Ravens the final score.

The Rams defense could not contain the Ravens offense all game, especially the running game.

With the loss, the Rams fell to 4-6, extending their losing streak to 3 games.

Week 12: at Cincinnati Bengals

The Rams suffered a blowout loss to the Cincinnati Bengals.

A rejuvenated Nick Foles got his starting job back after being benched in favor of Case Keenum, who suffered a concussion after last week's loss in Baltimore. However, Foles' return was marred as he struggled to find open receivers and was picked off three times by the Bengals ranked defense. He also took hits throughout the game and he was sacked a few times. The only Rams score was a 5-yard run by Tavon Austin on a reverse play in the second quarter.

St. Louis' defense was not a factor all game as they struggled to stop the high-powered Bengals offense led by quarterback Andy Dalton, and receivers A. J. Green, and Tyler Eifert, (the latter left the game with a stinger) who is leading the league in touchdown catches.

With the loss, the Rams extended their losing streak to 4 games, making their record 4-7.

Week 13: vs. Arizona Cardinals

This game was the second time in the season the Rams wore their 1999 throwbacks and the second time the Rams face the Cardinals.

Although they did put pressure on Carson Palmer, St Louis' defense overall failed to stop Arizona's much-hyped offense, especially the running game. As for the Rams offense, Todd Gurley was limited to just 41 rushing yards.

With the loss, the Rams dropped to 4-8.
A day after, the Rams fired offensive coordinator Frank Cignetti.

Week 14: vs. Detroit Lions

The Rams finally snapped their 4-game losing streak by defeating the Detroit Lions.

A photo of rapper and Roc Nation founder Jay Z in the Rams locker room along with his client Todd Gurley, and several Rams players was released shortly after.

With the win, the Rams went up to 5-8.

Week 15: vs. Tampa Bay Buccaneers

The Rams hosted the Tampa Bay Buccaneers, led by rookie quarterback Jameis Winston.

The "Color Rush" jerseys was used for this game. It was the first time the Rams wore the Color Rush Jersey.

In what ultimately turned out to be their final game played in St. Louis, before returning to Los Angeles for next season, Rams fans were seen holding signs saying, "Keep the Rams in St. Louis" and chants of "Keep the Rams" were heard after the game.

Despite offensive production from Tampa Bay, the Rams still managed a 31-23 victory and went to 6-8 with Case Keenum throwing for 234 yards and 2 touchdowns, Todd Gurley rushing 48 yards, Tavon Austin rushing 32 yards and a touchdown, Kenny Britt receiving for 71 yards and 1 touchdown, and Jared Cook receiving for 64 yards. The Rams offense dominated this game as well the defense also put pressure on the Buccaneers quarterback Jameis Winston.

With the win, the Rams improved their record to 6-8.

Week 16: at Seattle Seahawks

The Seahawks win over Cleveland in Week 15 eliminated the Rams from playoff contention for the 11th consecutive season. The Rams were able to sweep their division rival, the Seattle Seahawks in their regular season series. The last time the Rams did this was 2004.

With that win, the Rams record improved to 7-8, riding a 3-game winning streak.

Week 17: at San Francisco 49ers

This Rams faced the 49ers in the season in what was their final game as the St. Louis Rams before moving to Los Angeles. Unlike in Week 8 at home, the Rams lost the game 16-19 in overtime.  The Rams were without Todd Gurley, who suffered a foot injury in the third quarter of Week 16's win at Seattle.

With that loss, the Rams finished the 2015 NFL season at 7-9, making the season the ninth consecutive losing season for the Rams in St. Louis.

Standings

Division

Conference

Awards and honors

References

External links
 

St. Louis
St. Louis Rams seasons
St. Louis Rams